Edmund Crawford Carns (February 19, 1844 – March 12, 1895) was the second lieutenant governor of Nebraska, United States, serving from 1879 to 1883 while Albinus Nance was Governor. He was first elected state senator in 1876.

Early life
Edmund received an academic education from Witherspoon Institute. During the Civil War, he enlisted under the 1st Minnesota Regiment and served until the end of the war as a sergeant. In 1873, he moved to Nebraska after living in several other states, including Illinois, Minnesota and California.

References

1844 births
1895 deaths
Lieutenant Governors of Nebraska
Nebraska state senators
19th-century American politicians